Muhacir or Muhajir (from ) are the estimated 10 million Ottoman Muslim citizens, and their descendants born after the onset of the dissolution of the Ottoman Empire, mostly Turks but also Albanians, Bosniaks, Greek Muslims, Circassians, Crimean Tatars, Bulgarian Muslims, Pomaks, Serb Muslims, and Muslim Roma who emigrated to East Thrace and Anatolia from the late 18th century until the end of the 20th century, mainly to escape ongoing persecution in their homelands. Today, between a quarter and a third of Turkey's population of 85 million have ancestry from these Muhacirs.

170,000 Muslims were expelled from the part of Hungary taken by the Austrians from the Turks in 1699. Approximately 5-7 million Muslim migrants from the Balkans (from Bulgaria 1.15 million-1.5 million; Greece 1.2 million; Romania, 400,000; Yugoslavia, 800,000), Russia (500,000), the Caucasus (900,000, of whom two thirds remained, the rest going to Syria, Jordan and Cyprus) and Syria (500,000, mostly as a result of the Syrian Civil War) arrived in Ottoman Anatolia and modern Turkey from 1783 to 2016 of whom 4 million came by 1924, 1.3 million came post-1934 to 1945 and more than 1.2 million before the outbreak of the Syrian Civil War. Since the Syrian Civil War more than 3.7 million Syrians migrated to Turkey, but the classification of the Syrian refugees as Muhacirs has been described as controversial and politically charged.

The influx of migration during the late 19th century and early 20th century was due to the loss of almost all Ottoman territory during the Balkan War of 1912-13 and World War I. These Muhacirs, or refugees, saw the Ottoman Empire, and subsequently the Republic of Turkey, as a protective "motherland". Many of the Muhacirs escaped to Anatolia as a result of the widespread persecution of Ottoman Muslims that occurred during the last years of the Ottoman Empire.

Thereafter, with the establishment of the Republic of Turkey in 1923, a large influx of Turks, as well as other Muslims, from the Balkans, the Black Sea, the Caucasus, the Aegean islands, the island of Cyprus, the Sanjak of Alexandretta (İskenderun), the Middle East, and the Soviet Union continued to arrive in the region, most of which settled in urban north-western Anatolia. During the Circassian genocide, 800,000–1,500,000 Muslim Circassians were systematically mass murdered, ethnically cleansed, and expulsed from their homeland Circassia in the aftermath of the Russo-Circassian War (1763–1864). In 1923 more than half a million ethnic Muslims of various nationalities arrived from Greece as part of the population exchange between Greece and Turkey (the population exchange was not based on ethnicity but religious affiliation). After 1925, Turkey continued to accept Turkic-speaking Muslims as immigrants and did not discourage the emigration of members of non-Turkic minorities. More than 90 percent of all immigrants arrived from the Balkan countries.  From 1934 till 1945, 229,870 refugees and immigrants came to Turkey. Between 1935 and 1940, for example, approximately 124,000 Bulgarians and Romanians of Turkish origin immigrated to Turkey, and between 1954 and 1956 about 35,000 Muslim Slavs immigrated from Yugoslavia. In the fifty-five-year period ending in 1980, Turkey admitted approximately 1.3 million immigrants; 36 percent came from Bulgaria, 25 percent from Greece, 22.1 percent from Yugoslavia, and 8.9 percent from Romania. These Balkan immigrants, as well as smaller numbers of Turkic immigrants from Cyprus and the Soviet Union, were granted full citizenship upon their arrival in Turkey. The immigrants were settled primarily in the Marmara and Aegean regions (78 percent) and in Central Anatolia (11.7 percent).

From the 1930s to 2016 migration added two million Muslims in Turkey. The majority of these immigrants were the Balkan Turks who faced harassment and discrimination in their homelands. New waves of Turks and other Muslims expelled from Bulgaria and Yugoslavia between 1951 and 1953 were followed to Turkey by another exodus from Bulgaria in 1983-89, bringing the total of immigrants to nearly ten million people.

More recently, Meskhetian Turks have emigrated to Turkey from the former Soviet Union states (particularly in Ukraine - after the annexation of Crimea by the Russian Federation in 2014), and many Iraqi Turkmen and Syrian Turkmen have taken refuge in Turkey due to the recent Iraq War (2003-2011) and Syrian Civil War (2011–present).

Algeria 

Initially, the first wave of migration occurred in 1830 when many Algerian Turks were forced to leave the region once the French took control over Algeria; approximately 10,000 Turks were shipped off to Izmir, in Turkey, whilst many others also migrated to Palestine, Syria, Arabia, and Egypt.

Bulgaria 

The first wave of emigration from Bulgaria occurred during the Russo-Turkish War (1828–1829) when around 30,000 Bulgarian Turks arrived in Turkey. The second wave of about 750,000 emigrants left Bulgaria during the Russo-Turkish War of 1877-78, but approximately one-fourth of them died on the way. More than 200,000 of the rest remained inside the present borders of Turkey whilst the others were sent to other parts of the Ottoman Empire. The aftermath of the war led to major demographic restructuring of the ethnic and religious make-up of Bulgaria. As a result of these migrations, the percentage of Turks in Bulgaria was reduced from more than one-third of the population immediately after the Russo-Turkish War to 14.2% in 1900. Substantial numbers of Turks continued to emigrate to Turkey during, and following, the Balkan Wars and the First World War, in accordance with compulsory exchange of population agreements between Greece, Bulgaria, and Turkey. By 1934 the Turkish community had been reduced to 9.7% of Bulgaria’s total population and continued to fall during the subsequent decades.

Communist rule after the Second World War ended most emigration from Bulgaria, but further bilateral agreements were negotiated in the early 1950s and late 1960s to regulate the outflow of Bulgarian Turks. The heavy taxation, nationalisation of private minority schools, and measures against the Turkish culture in the name of the modernisation of Bulgaria, built up great pressure for the Turkish minority to emigrate and, when exit restrictions were relaxed in 1950, many ethnic Turks applied to leave. In August 1950 the Bulgarian government announced that 250,000 ethnic Turks had made applications to emigrate and pressured Turkey to accept them within three months. However, the Turkish authorities declared that the country could not accept these numbers in such a short time and closed its borders over the following year. In what was tantamount to an expulsion, pressure for ethnic Turks to leave continued, and by late 1951 some 155,000 Turks left Bulgaria. Most had abandoned their property or sold it at well below its value; most of these emigrants settled successfully primarily in the Marmara and Aegean regions, helped by the distribution of land and the provision of housing. In 1968 another agreement was reached between the two countries, which allowed the departure of relatives of those who had left up to 1951 to unite with their divided families, and another 115,000 people left Bulgaria for Turkey between 1968-78.

The latest wave of Turkish emigration began with an exodus in 1989, known as the "big excursion", when the Bulgarian Turks fled to Turkey in order to escape a campaign of forced assimilation. This marked a dramatic culmination of years of tension among the Turkish community, which intensified with the Bulgarian government's assimilation campaign in the winter of 1985 that attempted to make ethnic Turks change their names to Bulgarian Slavic names. The campaign began with a ban on wearing traditional Turkish dress, and speaking the Turkish language in public places, followed by the forced name-changing campaign. By May 1989, the Bulgarian authorities began to expel the Turks; when the Turkish government's efforts to negotiate with Bulgaria for an orderly migration failed, Turkey opened its borders to Bulgaria on 2 June 1989. However, on 21 August 1989, Turkey reintroduced immigration visa requirements for Bulgarian Turks. It was estimated that about 360,000 ethnic Turks had left for Turkey, though more than a third subsequently returned to Bulgaria once the ban on Turkish names had been revoked in December 1989. Nonetheless, once the Bulgarian communist regime fell, and Bulgarian citizens were allowed freedom of travel again, some 218,000 Bulgarians left the country for Turkey. The subsequent emigration wave was prompted by continuously deteriorating economic conditions; furthermore, the first democratic elections in 1990 won by the renamed communist party resulted in 88,000 people leaving the country, once again, most of them being Bulgarian Turks. By 1992, emigration to Turkey resumed at a greater rate. However, this time they were pushed by economic reasons since the country’s economic decline affected especially ethnically mixed regions. The Bulgarian Turks were left without state subsidies or other forms of state assistance and experienced deep recession. According to the 1992 census, some 344,849 Bulgarians of Turkish origin had migrated to Turkey between 1989 and 1992, which resulted in significant demographic decline in southern Bulgaria.

Caucasus 
The events of the Circassian Genocide, namely the ethnic cleansing, killing, forced migration, and expulsion of the majority of the Circassians from their historical homeland in the Caucasus, resulted in the death of approximately at least 600,000 Caucasian natives up to 1,500,000 deaths, and the successful migration of the remaining of 900,000 - 1,500,000 Caucasians which immigrated to Anatolia due to intermittent Russian attacks from 1768 to 1917; about two-thirds of them remained, and the rest were sent to Amman, Damascus, Aleppo, and Cyprus. Today there are up to 7,000,000 people of Circassian descent living in Turkey presumably more with Circassian descent since it's been hard to differentiate between ethnic groups in Turkey.

Crimea 
From 1771 until the beginning of the 19th century approximately 500,000 Crimean Tatars arrived in Anatolia.

Russian officials usually posited a shared religious identity between Turks and Tatars as the primary driving force behind the Tatar migrations. They reasoned that Muslim Tatars would not want to live in Orthodox Russia which had annexed Crimea before the 1792 Treaty of Jassy. With this treaty began an exodus of Nogai Tatars to the Ottoman Empire.

Prior to the annexation, the Tatar nobility (mizra) could not make the peasants a serf class, a fact that had allowed the Tatar peasants relative freedom compared to other parts of Eastern Europe, and they were permitted use of all "wild and untilled" lands for cultivation. Under the "wild lands" rules Crimea had expanded its agricultural lands as farmers cultivated previously untilled lands. Many aspects of land ownership and the relationship between the mizra and peasants was government were governed under Islamic law. After the annexation many of the communal lands of the Crimean Tatars were confiscated by Russians. The migrations to the Ottoman Empire began when their hopes of Ottoman victory were dashed at the close of the Russo-Turkish War of 1787-1792.

Cyprus

The first wave of immigration from Cyprus occurred in 1878 when the Ottomans were obliged to lease the island to Great Britain; at that time, 15,000 Turkish Cypriots moved to Anatolia. The flow of Turkish Cypriot emigration to Turkey continued in the aftermath of the First World War, and gained its greatest velocity in the mid-1920s, and continued, at fluctuating speeds during the Second World War. Turkish Cypriot migration has continued since the Cyprus conflict.

Economic motives played an important part in the Turkish Cypriot migration wave as conditions for the poor in Cyprus during the 1920s were especially harsh. Enthusiasm to emigrate to Turkey was inflated by the euphoria that greeted the birth of the newly established Republic of Turkey and later of promises of assistance to Turks who emigrated. A decision taken by the Turkish Government at the end of 1925, for instance, noted that the Turks of Cyprus had, according to the Treaty of Lausanne, the right to emigrate to the republic, and therefore, families that so emigrated would be given a house and sufficient land. The precise number of those who emigrated to Turkey is a matter that remains unknown. The press in Turkey reported in mid-1927 that of those who had opted for Turkish nationality, 5,000–6,000 Turkish Cypriots had already settled in Turkey. However, many Turkish Cypriots had already emigrated even before the rights accorded to them under the Treaty of Lausanne had come into force.

St. John-Jones tried to accurately estimate the true demographic impact of Turkish Cypriot emigration to Turkey between 1881-1931. He supposed that:

According to Ali Suat Bilge, taking into consideration the mass migrations of 1878, the First World War, the 1920s early Turkish Republican era, and the Second World War, overall, a total of approximately 100,000 Turkish Cypriots had left the island for Turkey between 1878-1945. By August 31, 1955, a statement by Turkey's Minister of State and Acting Foreign Minister, Fatin Rüştü Zorlu, at the London Conference on Cyprus, stated that:

By 2001 the TRNC Ministry of Foreign Affairs estimated that 500,000 Turkish Cypriots were living in Turkey.

Greece 

The immigration of the Turks from Greece started in the early 1820s upon the establishment of an independent Greece in 1829. By the end of World War I approximately 800,000 Turks had immigrated to Turkey from Greece. Then, in accordance with the 1923 Treaty of Lausanne, under the 1923 Convention Concerning the Exchange of Greek and Turkish Populations, Greece and Turkey agreed to the compulsory exchange of ethnic populations. The term "Mübadil" was used to refer specifically to this migration. Between 350,000 and 500,000 Muslim Turks emigrated from Greece to Turkey, and about 1.3 million Orthodox Christian "Greeks" from Turkey moved to Greece. "Greek" and "Turkish" was defined by religion rather than linguistically or culturally. According to Article 1 of the Convention "…There shall take place a compulsory exchange of Turkish nationals of the Greek Orthodox religion established in Turkish territory, and of Greek nationals of the Muslim religion established in Greek territory. These persons shall not return to live in Turkey or Greece without the authorization of the Turkish government or of the Greek government".

An article published in The Times on December 5, 1923, stated that:

The only exclusions from the forced transfer were the Christians living in Constantinople (Istanbul) and the Western Thrace Turks. The remaining Turks living in Greece have since continuously emigrated to Turkey, a process which has been facilitated by Article 19 of the Greek Nationality Law which the Greek state has used to deny re-entry of Turks who leave the country, even for temporary periods, and deprived them of their citizenship. Since 1923, between 300,000 and 400,000 Turks of Western Thrace left the region, most of them went to Turkey.

Romania 

Immigration from Romania to Anatolia dates back to the early 1800s when the Russian armies made advances into the region. During the Ottoman period, the greatest waves of immigration took place in 1826 when approximately 200,000 people arrived in Turkey and then in 1878-1880 with 90,000 arrivals. Following the Republican period, an agreement made, on September 4, 1936, between Romania and Turkey allowed 70,000 Romanian Turks to leave the Dobruja region for Turkey. By the 1960s, inhabitants living in the Turkish exclave of Ada Kaleh were forced to leave the island when it was destroyed in order to build the Iron Gate I Hydroelectric Power Station, which caused the extinction of the local community through the migration of all individuals to different parts of Romania and Turkey.

Syria 

In December 2016 the Turkish Foreign Ministry Undersecretary Ümit Yalçın stated that Turkey opened its borders to 500,000 Syrian Turkmen refugees fleeing the Syrian Civil War.

Yugoslavia 

Immigration from Yugoslavia started in the 1800s as a consequence of the Serb revolution. Approximately 150,000 Muslims immigrated to Anatolia in 1826, and then, in 1867, a similar number of Muslims moved to Anatolia. In 1862–67 Muslim exiles from the Principality of Serbia settled in the Bosnia Vilayet. Upon the proclamation of the Republic of Turkey, 350,000 migrants arrived in Turkey between 1923 and 1930. An additional 160,000 people immigrated to Turkey after the establishment of Communist Yugoslavia from 1946 to 1961. Since 1961, immigrants from that Yugoslavia amounted to 50,000 people.

See also 
 Persecution of Ottoman Muslims
 Immigration to Turkey
 Turkish minorities in the former Ottoman Empire
 Misak-ı Millî
 Muhajirs (Albanians)
 Massacre of Phocaea

References

Bibliography 

 
 
 
 
 
 .
 
 
 
 
 
 
 
 
 
 
 
 
 
 
 
 
 
 
 
 
 
 
 .

External links 

 Population Exchange Museum

Society of Turkey
Ethnic groups in Turkey
History of the Balkans
Bosniak history
Historical migrations
Persecution of Ottoman Muslims